Fulham Football Club is an English professional football team based in Fulham in the London Borough of Hammersmith and Fulham. The club was formed in West Kensington in 1879 as Fulham St Andrew's Church Sunday School F.C., shortened to Fulham F.C. in 1888. They initially played at Fulham Fields before a move to Craven Cottage in 1896; the club played their first professional match in December 1898 and made their FA Cup debut in the 1902–03 season. The club competed in the Southern Football League between 1898 and 1907, when they were accepted into the Football League Second Division. Having spent much of their history outside the top division, the team gained promotion to the Premier League in 2001. They spent more than ten seasons in the top flight, and reached the final of the UEFA Europa League in 2010. In 2014 they were relegated to the Championship. They have since spent one further season back in the Premier League in 2018–19 but suffered an immediate return to the Championship.

Since the club's first competitive match, 966 players have made an appearance in a competitive match, of which 284 have made between 25 and 99 appearances (including substitute appearances); all players who have reached this milestone are listed below. Jake Iceton, who played in goal in the 1930s, holds the highest number of appearances (99) amongst those who have played less than 100 matches for the club. Kenny Achampong, Gavin Nebbeling and Bert Pearce all made 97 appearances for Fulham. André-Frank Zambo Anguissa, Joe Bryan, Cyrus Christie, Aboubakar Kamara, Neeskens Kebano, Maxime Le Marchand, Aleksandar Mitrović, Jean Michaël Seri are the current squad members who have played between 25 and 99 matches for Fulham.

Players
This list contains the 284 players, including eight current squad members, as of 30 August 2019, who have made between 25 and 99 appearances for Fulham, ordered by the years in which they played for the club and then alphabetically by surname. The figure for league appearances and goals comprise those in the Southern Football League, the Football League and the Premier League. Total appearances and goals comprise those in the Southern Football League, Football League (including play-offs), Premier League, FA Cup, Football League Cup, Football League Trophy, UEFA Intertoto Cup and UEFA Cup/Europa League. Wartime matches are regarded as unofficial and are excluded, as are matches from the abandoned 1939–40 season. Statistics for the Watney Cup and Anglo-Scottish Cup are not included in the table. International appearances and goals are given for the senior national team only, although appearances at a lower international level are noted.

Figures are mostly taken from Fulham: The Complete Record by Dennis Turner (published in 2007). UEFA Intertoto Cup and UEFA Cup/Europa League appearance statistics for 2002–03 and 2009–10 are taken from Soccerbase, along with all other statistics from the 2007–08 season onwards.

This article is about players who have made between 25 and 99 appearances for Fulham. For other Fulham players, see :Category:Fulham F.C. players. For the current Fulham first-team squad, see Fulham F.C.#Current squad.

Statistics are correct as of 30 August 2019. International statistics correct as of 19 July 2019.

Notes

References
General
 
 
 Fulham at Soccerbase.
 .
 

Specific

External links
Fulham F.C. official website

Players 25-99
Players 25-99
 25-99
Fulham 25-99
Association football player non-biographical articles